Ahmed Al-Turki (born 19 May 1994) is a Saudi footballer who plays as a winger.

References
 

1994 births
Living people
Saudi Arabian footballers
Association football wingers
Al-Taawoun FC players
Al-Tai FC players
Al-Saqer FC players
Saudi First Division League players
Saudi Professional League players
Saudi Fourth Division players